Geoffrey Nevill  (31 October 1900 – 22 October 1972) was a New Zealand public servant who served as Resident Commissioner of the Chatham Islands and Cook Islands between 1950 and 1961.

Biography
Born on 31 October 1900, Nevill was the son of Henry Guy Nevill and Rosa Louisa Nevill (née Bull). The younger brother of Arthur Nevill, Chief of the New Zealand Air Force between 1946 and 1951, he attended school in Australia and Auckland Grammar School. He was appointed Resident Commissioner of the Chatham Islands in February 1950, serving until 1952 when he became Resident Commissioner of the Cook Islands. He remained in post until retiring in January 1961, and was appointed an Officer of the Order of the British Empire in the 1961 New Year Honours.

Nevill died on 22 October 1972.

References

1900 births
1972 deaths
People educated at Auckland Grammar School
New Zealand public servants
Resident Commissioners of the Cook Islands
Officers of the Order of the British Empire
New Zealand justices of the peace